The Aesthetica Short Film Festival (ASFF) is an international film festival which takes place annually in York, England, at the beginning of November. Founded in 2011, it is a celebration of independent film from around the world, and an outlet for supporting and championing filmmaking. With over 400 films screenings and 100 industry events, ASFF is one of the UK's key film festivals.

ASFF is also a BAFTA-Qualifying festival, meaning short films that are screened may be eligible for a BAFTA award.

The festival is hosted by Aesthetica Magazine, one of the world's leading art and culture publications and supported by York St John University, London College of Communication and the British Film Institute.

History
ASFF is hosted by Aesthetica, a British art and culture magazine. Initially launched as the Aesthetica Short Film Competition, winning films were included on a DVD released with the December/January edition of Aesthetica. The competition received a significant number of entries, and it developed into the Aesthetica Short Film Festival.

2011
The first edition took place in 2011. The festival brought filmmakers and audiences from locations including South Africa, New Zealand, the US and from across Europe, to the city of York. Among those delivering masterclasses were Mark Herman (Screenwriter, The Boy in the Striped Pyjamas), Ivana Mackinnon (Executive Producer, Slumdog Millionaire) and the Senior Commissioner for Channel 4.

ASFF 2011 received positive feedback and was covered in The Guardian.

2012
ASFF 2012 screened over 200 films across 15 different locations. Masterclasses were held by Danny Cohen (BAFTA-nominated cinematographer of The King’s Speech, The Boat That Rocked and Glorious 39), Barry Ryan the head of Warp Films (Dead Man’s Shoes, Four Lions, This is England and Submarine) and Matt Greenhalgh (BAFTA winning screenwriter of Control and Nowhere Boy). The festival also included screenings, panel discussions, special events and parties.

2013
The third edition expanded the Official Programme, screening over 300 films. Saera Jin, director of the comedy Konnichiwa Brick Lane was in attendance, alongside Curt Apduhan who discussed the making of his drama Anniversary. Manjinder Virk received the Festival Winner award for her short Out of Darkness, which the Observer's Chief Film Critic Mark Kermode described as "intriguing and thought provoking."

Events included a series of masterclasses from Joakim Sundström (Seven Psychopaths), Craig McNeil from Beggars Group, Warp Films, Film4, Channel 4, Alice Lowe (Sightseers, Hot Fuzz) and more. There were also special programmes from BAFTA, Yorkshire Film Archive, and Screen Bandita.

2014
ASFF received BAFTA (British Academy of Film and Television Arts) Recognised status in 2014. The festival was also awarded Festival of the Year by York Press.

Notable films include Alan Holly's Coda, shortlisted for the 87th Academy Awards and nominated for the 42nd Annual Annie Awards, starring Brian Gleeson and Orla Fitgerald. Actors starring in some of the short films also included Adeel Akhtar, Hugo Weaving, Maxine Peake and model Lily Cole.

The festival continued to showcase films in all genres and expanded its programme to include fashion and advertising. ASFF's fashion strand was supported by London College of Fashion and screened films from brands such as Vivienne Westwood, Swarovski, Louis Vuitton, Trager Delaney, Topshop, River Island, Karen Millen, Triwa watches and Hub Footwear.

New events included Meet the Film Festivals, which created a place for filmmakers to network with programmers from across the world. Festivals in attendance included Raindance; London Short Film Festival; Edinburgh International Film Festival; Garden State Film Festival and more.

2015
ASFF celebrated its fifth anniversary in 2015. The festival ran from 5 to 8 November and attracted 20,000 admissions.

The festival welcomed acclaimed industry figures for its Masterclass series, including BAFTA-winning Warp Films' Head of Production Barry Ryan (’71, Berberian Sound Studio, Four Lions and This is England); Stephen Whelan, Executive Producer and founder at White Lodge; and Price James, who worked previously at Ridley Scott Associates and is a director at BAFTA-winning production company Agile Films. Organisations also included Association of Camera Operators, Rankin Film, Shooting People, National Theatre, British Society of Cinematographers, Studio AKA, Channel 4, Framestore and more. ASFF 2015 also hosted the festival's first Videotheque, enabling festival goers the opportunity to watch all films from the Official Selection.

Winners from each category, plus Best of Fest, People's Choice Award and the York Youth Vote were announced at the ASFF Awards Ceremony on Sunday 8 November.

2016
ASFF 2016 ran 3 from 6 November, taking place in 18 venues. Masterclasses were led by industry representatives from organisations including the BBC, Industrial Light & Magic, and Jagex. BBC Commissioning Editor, Kristian Smith, joined writer of Raised by Wolves Caroline Moran to discuss development and pitching, while actress and writer Alice Lowe (The World’s End, Sightseers) spoke about how to bring a character to life. Events also included new daily Morning Coffee hours at According to McGee art gallery. There were Showcase Screenings curated by cultural organisations throughout the UK, including London College of Fashion University of the Arts London, Plymouth College of Art, University of York, Creative England and Northern Ireland Screen among others.

New for 2016, ASFF partnered with the Northern Film School at Leeds Beckett University to present an award for Best Screenplay in the Official Selection.

The Jury of industry professionals who selected the winners included representatives from BAFTA, Edinburgh International Film Festival and Encounters Film Festival.

2017
Extending to five days, the seventh edition of ASFF screened over 300 films across 18 unique venues throughout the city of York. The programme boasted a stunning selection of innovative and creative works from 41 countries. Audiences were given a chance to see several UK premieres with performances from some of the best-loved film and TV stars including; Martin Freeman, Imelda Staunton, Idris Elba and Nikolaj Coster-Waldau, and attend a dynamic line-up of masterclasses, networking sessions and panel discussions from notable industry leaders such as i-D, BBC and the British Film Institute.

ASFF also continued to build upon its diverse programming with a collection of exclusive screenings supported by Iris Prize, British Urban Film Festival and Kraków Film Festival.

Best of Fest winners were Benjamin Cleary and TJ O’Grady Peyton for Wave, the story of a man who wakes from a coma speaking a fully formed but unrecognisable language, which also went on to win the Best Drama Award. Cleary was also awarded the Best of Fest in 2015 for Stutterer, which received Best Live Action Short Film at the 88th Academy Awards.

Chris Overton's The Silent Child, a film inspired by real life events, that told the story of a deaf four-year-old girl, whose social worker teaches her the gift of communication, took home the Youth Award and the People's Choice Award. It went on to win Best Live Action Short Film at the 90th Academy Awards.

2018 
ASFF 2018 took place from 7 to 11 November. Combining industry-led events with screenings, the programme addressed diverse subject matters relating to the changing landscape of film. The line-up welcomed industry leaders from Aardman Studios, Film4, British Vogue, StudioCanal, BBC, Industrial Light & Magic, Dazed, Baby Cow, Pinewood Studios and more.

The eighth edition also welcomed Narrative and Documentary Feature Films for the first time. The decision came from the wider ethos to continue supporting talent development, as many festival alumni had progressed to features since first screening at ASFF, most notably director Francis Lee (God’s Own Country). Feature films in competition for the 2018 festival included Akram Khan's Giselle (As part of the English National Ballet), Mark Cousins' The Eyes of Orson Welles and Benjamin Wigley's Paa Joe & The Lion.

With the rise of digital platforms, ASFF also took steps into virtual landscapes with the launch of the Screen School VR Lab in partnership with London College of Communication. Screenings were complemented by a series of panel discussions delving into the making and realisation of VR and 360 film through the lens of ethics, production and storytelling.

Best of Fest was awarded to Ed Perkins for his film Black Sheep, which told the story of Cornelius Walker and the murder of Damilola Taylor, in what became one of the UK's most high-profile cases. The film also received Best Documentary and the Northern Film School Award for Best Screenplay.

2019 
The Aesthetica Short Film Festival ran 6 to 10 November. With over 400 films and 100 industry events programmed, it was the most extensive edition to date. For 2019, Masterclasses welcomed cultural powerhouses such as British Vogue, i-D and Rankin, as well as Emmy- and Oscar-nominated producers, directors, sound designers, editors and cinematographers such as Simon Chinn, Dick Pope, Tracey Granger and Mick Audsley. First hand insights into the industry were also given by Framestore, SKY VR, Baby Cow, Bluezoo, BFI NETWORK, Aardman, Industrial Light & Magic, BBC and more.

Additional events included the launch of ASFF's Industry Marketplace, the first event of its kind in the UK. Over 40 exhibitors were included, from BFI NETWORK, Locarno Film Festival, Creative England, to Edinburgh Film Festival, Sheffield Doc/Fest, Hijack Post, London College of Communication and Festival Formula. The event was a platform for attendees and delegates to engage with key organisations from across the sector, including international film festivals, screen agencies, sales agents, global distributors and renowned universities.

Guest Programme screenings from The Guardian, Studio AKA, BBC Arabic Festival also took place across the festival's five-day run, as well as the return of the Screen School VR Lab, created in partnership with London College of Communication.

Best of Festival was awarded to Sasha Rainbow for her film Kofi and Lartey, which tells the story of a man who escaped one of the most toxic places in the world, and his fight to try and empower two young boys to do the same. The 2019 festival also included the presentation of the Hijack Visionary Filmmaker Award, which was taken home by Ellie Rogers for her film They Found Her in a Field. The award recognises directors with exceptional vision and a unique cinematic voice, with the winner receiving a generous post production package for their next short film.

2020 
ASFF's 10th anniversary edition finds a new home in an accessible online space for 2020, running 3–8 November. From 9–30 November, the content will be available on Demand as part of ASFF's virtual platform. This year, ASFF presents its most expansive programme to date, with over 450 curated films from across the world and more than 100 live industry events, all available on a virtual platform.

Beyond the Official Selection, ASFF presents a unique festival experience, welcoming specially curated guest programmes, showcase screenings from leading film schools and universities, as well as a schedule of live industry events, featuring renowned speakers from across a range of crafts.

Guest speakers include Oscar-Winning Director Andrea Arnold (Wasp, Fish Tank, American Honey), BAFTA-winning filmmaker Sarah Gavron (This Little Life, Suffragette, Rocks), BIFA-winning and Emmy-nominated Documentarian Jeanie Finlay (Seahorse, Orion: The Man Who Would Be King, Game of Thrones: The Last Watch), celebrated Filmmaker Sam Feder (DISCLOSURE, Boy I Am), Oscar Winning Sound Designer Glenn Freemantle (Gravity, Annihilation), double Oscar-winning VFX Supervisor Paul Franklin (Inception, Interstellar), as well as leading animators, cinematographers, editors, production designers and representatives from Film4, BBC Films, Framestore and many more.

Films in competition will be released in 6 Strands from 3–8 November, with 10 programmes per day. The strand titles include: Just Another Day on Earth, Humans and their Environment, Connections: People, Places and Identity, Breaking Down Barriers and Keep on the Sunny Side of Life.

Guest programmes have also expanded for 2020. These include: Indigenous Cinema: Celebrating Visual Narrative Sovereignty (Native Spirit FF), Cinesisters: A Platform for Female Voices (Cinesisters), Tales from Isolation (Short of the Week), TransFormation, TransAction (Transgender Media Portal), BFI Doc Society Presents: Documenting Modern Britain (Doc Society), Hanoi Stories (Scottish Documentary Institute), Fresh Perspectives: Making Space for Disability (OSKA BRIGHT), The True Glory: Remembering WWII (IWM), I Still Can't Breathe (Directors Notes, Can We Talk DXB), The Future of AI: People and Data (DC LABS), Iris Prize Presents: LGBT+ Shorts (Iris Prize), Short Films from Brazil (São Paulo Short Film Festival), Perspectives from the Arctic Circle: Norway on Film (Norwegian Short Film Festival).

The 2020 tickets are 24-hour, 7-day and 1-Month Film & Industry Passes.

2021 
The 11th edition of the BAFTA-Qualifying Aesthetica Film Festival went hybrid, incorporating both live and virtual events spanning 2–30 November. It featured over 300 films, 100 industry events and 100 speakers from across the globe. The programme was curated into six conceptual strands: How it was, How it is, How it will be?, Humanity on the Edge, When Life Gives You Lemons, Make Lemonade, Pleased to Meet You, Mirror, Mirror and Nobody's Free Until Everybody is Free.

Diversity played a large part in the programme, with industry events and screenings that have LGBTQ+, communities, Black Lives Matter, women, gender and identity at the core. Programming took a look at on-screen representations, whilst subverting the status quo. As part of this year’s Guest Programmes, ASFF looked at 9/11, commemorating 20 years since the terrorist attack. Complementary programmes spotlighted works from Ireland, China, Kenya and North Africa, with Scottish Documentary Institute, Iris Prize, Imperial War Museum, We Are Parable, Girls in Film South Africa and more.

The 2021 industry programme was extensive: looking at everything from VFX, animation and cinematography, to editing, screenwriting and virtual reality. Alongside industry giants such as Sally Potter, Maxine Peake, Gamba Cole, Craig Roberts, Framestore, ILM, Film4, Channel 4, BBC Film, the festival featured some of the UK’s leading rising stars such as Alice Seabright, Francis Lee and Prano Bailey-Bond, who are all Aesthetica alumni. Alongside the industry and film programmes were multiple opportunities to network and connect, as well as pitch projects to the likes of Film 4, BBC Film, Guardian Documentaries, StudioCanal and DocSociety.

2022 
In 2022, the Aesthetica Film Festival took place in-person in the centre of York from 1-6 November. It continued virtually through the festival's responsive online platform until 30 November. A programme of 300 films was curated into six thematic strands: Life As We Know It, The Bigger Picture, We'll Cross That Bridge When We Come To It, Who Do You Do?, Be Yourself, Everybody Else Is Taken and The Present Was Their Idea Of The Future. Guest Programmes from around the globe also shared new perspectives, with shorts from We Are Parable, Queer East Film Festival, Iris Prize, Scottish Documentary Institute and more. New Wave films also offered a taste of the next generation of film. Showcases from Regents University, York St Johns University and London College of Fashion explored the craft of filmmaking, authenticity in storytelling and how fashion questions everything from identity politics to the climate emergency.

Masterclasses brought together some of the biggest industry names, organisations and agencies to offer advice on funding, sustainability, cinematography, and making the transition from short to feature filmmaking. The festival welcomed BAFTA, Oscar and BIFA-winning directors, actors and producers, including Philip Barantini (Boiling Point), Lizzie Franck (Aftersun) and Claire Oakley (Makeup), plus prestigious organisations such as Ubisoft, BFI, Framestore, Guardian Documentaries, BBC Writersroom, Ridley Scott Creative Group, Film4 and more. The industry programme was also expanded for 2022 to include workshops on VR, 360 film and writing from London College of Communication, London College of Fashion, Gal-dem, Canon and more. The festival's new Kids' Workshops also gave young people the opportunity to direct, edit and make their own films. 2022 also marked the first year of Aesthetica Fringe events, including art exhibition Unite. Transform. Create. held at Streetlife York.

Call for Entries
The Aesthetica Short Film Festival opens for entries in December and closes on 31 May. The festival welcomes submissions from emerging and established filmmakers from around the world. Short films with a maximum running time of 30 minutes are accepted across the following genres: advertising, animation, artists' film, comedy, dance, documentary, drama, experimental, fashion, music video, thriller and VR. Feature films are also accepted across Narrative and Documentary genres, running over 60 minutes.

Awards
All films in the Official Selection are in competition to receive a number of awards. These awards recognise outstanding talent in filmmaking practice. The winning films are selected by a jury of industry experts, and are presented at the Closing Night Awards Ceremony. ASFF is also a BAFTA-Qualifying festival, meaning short films that are screened may be eligible for a BAFTA award.

Sponsored by BFI NETWORK and Film Hub North, the Polaris Award celebrates the achievements of a filmmaker based in the North of England.

New for 2019, the Hijack Visionary Filmmaker Award recognises directors with exceptional vision and a unique cinematic voice. The winner receives a generous post production package for their next short film.

Previous winners have gone on to achieve further award success, including Oscar wins (The Silent Child, Chris Overton in 2017 and Stutterer, Benjamin Cleary, in 2016).

2011 Winners

2012 Winners

2013 Winners

2014 Winners

2015 Winners

2016 Winners

2017 Winners

2018 Winners

2019 Winners

2020 Winners

2021 Winners

References

External links
Aesthetica Short Film Festival Website
ASFF 2014 Programme

Film festivals in England
Festivals in York
Short film festivals in the United Kingdom